The Judeo-Tat Theatre in Derbent, Dagestan, Russia specializes in staging plays with themes related to the lives of Mountain Jews, which are created mainly by Mountain Jews. The plays are performed in the Judeo-Tat language (Juhuri).

The founding of the theatre

Traditionally, the Judeo-Tat Theatre created and performed works in Derbent, since that is where most of the Mountain Jews lived. The first theatrical event by Mountain Jews took place in December 1903,  when Asaf Agarunov, a teacher and a Zionist, staged a story by Naum Shoykovich, translated from Hebrew, "The Burn for Burn," and staged it in honor of schoolteacher Nagdimuna ben Simona’s (Shimunov) wedding. 

In 1918, a drama studio was opened in Derbent, headed by Rabbi Yashaiyo Rabinovich. Since 1924, the Mountain Jewish collective began to be called the cultural and educational circle of Mountain Jewish youth, abbreviated as  – "GEM Circle." It was headed by Yuno Semyonov (1899–1961) and Manashir Shalumov. 

In 1924, Yuno Semyonov put on two plays in the Derbent Mountain Jews circle – "Two leather sellers" and "A cunning matchmaker."

In 1935, the first Soviet Union theatre opened in Derbent, which included three troupes – Russian, Mountain Jews and Turk. It was based on drama circles, which were led by Manashir and Khanum Shalumov. Initially, in the circle, men played the female roles. Later, women began to take part in the theatre. A period of prosperity began: many performances were staged. In 1939, the Judeo-Tat theatre was the winner of the festival of theatres in Dagestan. The music for the play was written by the theater’s composer and musical director, Jumshud (Shumshun) Shevanyevich Ashurov (1913–1980), "Honored Artist of Dagestan." At the beginning of 1941, the theatre held rehearsals of the play "The Rift" by Boris Lavrenyov and "Aydin" by Jafar Jabbarly.

The drama group in Gyrmyzy Gasaba in Azerbaijan

From 1920 to 1932, the Judeo-Tat drama group was active in the Mountain Jews settlement in Gyrmyzy Gasaba in Azerbaijan.

Theatre during World War II

During World War II, most of the actors were drafted into the army. Many theatre actors died in the war.
In 1943, the theatre resumed its work, and in 1948 it was closed. The official reason was its unprofitability.

Post-war period

On April 28, 1959, the board of the Stalin collective farm appealed to the city’s party committee, requesting to create a Mountain Jews people's theatre as an amateur art circle.

Pyotr Rafailovich Agarunov (1930–2006), "Excellent worker of the USSR State Television and Radio Broadcasting," was invited from Baku to organize the further work of the theatre. Musaib Mammadalievich Jum Jum (1905–1974) who was of Azerbaijani descent, was invited to be theater director, and was called the "People's Artist of the DASSR." He was very familiar with the language and culture of the Mountain Jews. The composer Jumshud (Shumshun) Shevanyevich Ashurov was appointed music director. Mikhail Gavrilov (1926–2014), "Honored Worker of Culture of the Republic of Dagestan," was the administrator.

In the 1960s, the theatre resumed its activities and experienced its second heyday. The actress, the audience's favorite, Akhso Ilyaguevna Shalumova (1909-1985), "Honored Artist of the Dagestan ASSR" returned to the theatre.  She played the role of (Juhuri:Шими Дербенди) – Shimi Derbendi's wife – Shahnugor, based on the stories of writer Hizgil Avshalumov.

In the 1970s, the People's Judeo-Tat Theatre was organized. For many years, its director was Abram Avdalimov (1929-2004), "Honored Cultural Worker of the Dagestan ASSR," singer, actor and playwright. His successor was Roman Izyaev (1940–2018), who was awarded the Order of the Badge of Honour for his meritorious service.

In the 1990s, the Judeo-Tat Theatre experienced another crisis: it rarely held performances and did not have any premieres. Only in 2000, when it became a municipal theater, was it able to resume its activity. From 2000 to 2002, the theatre was headed by actor and musician Raziil Semenovich Ilyaguev (1945–2016), "Honored Worker of Culture of the Republic of Dagestan." For the next two years the theatre was headed by Alesya Isakova.

In 2004, Lev Yakovlevich Manakhimov (1950–2021), "Honored Artist of the Republic of Dagestan," became the artistic director of the theatre. After the death of Manakhimov, Boris Yudaev became the head of the theatre.

For a long period in the life of the Judeo-Tat theatre, many actors have performed on its stage, such as Bikel Peisakhovna Matatova (1928–2013), "Honored Workers of Culture of the Dagestan ASSR," Avshalum Yakubovich Nakhshunov (Shori-Artist) (1925–1997), "People’s Artist of the Republic of Dagestan," Mozol Aleksandrovna Izrailova, "Honored Worker of Culture of the Republic of Dagestan," Anatoly Yusupov, Raya Novakhova, Israel Tsvaygenbaum, Eva Shalver – Abramova and many others.

The founding of a theatre in Israel
In 2001, the artistic director, actor, screenwriter and decorator Roman Izyaev founded the Mountain Jews' theater "Rambam" in the Israeli city of Hadera. The collective has toured not only cities where Mountain Jews live in Israel, but also Canada, the United States, Azerbaijan and Moscow, Russia.

After the death of Roman Savievich Izyaev in 2018, Eva Shalver - Abramova became the chief director of the theater "Rambam.”

References

See also
The Judeo-Tat Theatre of Derbent staged a play about the "dashing 90s"
Mezuzah was installed in the premises of the Judeo-Tat theatre in Hadera
The world's only Judeo-Tat theatre from Israel performed for the first time in Russia
Mountain Jews take the stage
Judeo-Tat (Mountain Jewish) Theatre
The world's only Judeo-Tat theatre will perform in Moscow for the first time

 

Theatres in Russia
Theatres in Israel
Culture of Dagestan